Instacart is an American retail company that operates a grocery delivery and pick-up service in the United States and Canada. The company offers its services via a website and mobile app. The service allows customers to order groceries from participating retailers with the shopping being done by a personal shopper.

History

2010s
Instacart was founded in 2012 by entrepreneur Apoorva Mehta, a former Amazon.com employee. Apoorva was born in India and moved with his family to Canada in 2000. He studied engineering at the University of Waterloo and graduated in 2008. He was a participant in Y Combinator's Summer 2012 batch, which eventually led to the creation of Instacart. In 2013, Mehta was included on the Forbes 30 Under 30 list. Apoorva previously worked at BlackBerry, Qualcomm, and then Amazon as a supply chain engineer, where he developed fulfillment systems to move packages from Amazon's warehouses to customers' homes. He left Amazon in 2010 to attempt to start his own business. Before founding Instacart, Apoorva had tried to start at least 20 other services. He tried building an ad network for social gaming companies, and developing a social network specifically for lawyers, among other start-ups.

Instacart originally launched in San Francisco. Within a year, Instacart began offering an annual membership service called Instacart Express. By April 2015, the firm had about 200 employees. It introduced a new policy around June allowing some shoppers to choose to be part-time employees, starting with Chicago and Boston and extending its offer to shoppers in Atlanta, Miami, and Washington, D.C. the following month.

In September 2016, the company announced an expansion to its zone on the north side of Chicago. In October 2016, it announced the expansion of coverage areas in Orange County, California, and Minneapolis. In November 2016, the company changed its policy and removed the option to leave a gratuity in exchange for a service fee that would be used to pay workers instead. Backlash against the policy from customers and some shoppers forced the company to reinstate the option only weeks later with modifications that placed the tip under the service fee section on a separate page.

In March 2017, Instacart agreed to pay $4.6 million to settle a class action settlement stemming from the alleged misclassification of its personal shoppers as independent contractors. The suit, filed in March 2015, alleged 18 violations, including improper tip pooling and failure to reimburse workers for business expenses. The same year, Instacart raised $400 million in funding at a valuation of $3.4 billion. In November 2017, the company expanded to Canada by announcing a partnership with Loblaw Companies to begin delivery from select locations in Toronto and Vancouver. That same month, some Instacart workers participated in a strike action, alleging wages as low as $1 an hour. Instacart claimed that the strike had no impact on its operations.

In January 2018, the company acquired Toronto-based Unata, a white-label platform for grocers, for $65 million. In February 2018, Instacart withheld tips given by customers to shoppers, blaming a software bug. In addition, customers were often charged for service fees that were supposed to be waived. In April 2018, Instacart made a few additional changes to its pay service by instituting a mandatory 5% service fee on all orders. It originally offered an optional 10% service fee that went directly to Instacart that could be turned off. It also returned the gratuity option back to the checkout screen and raised the default value from 0% to 5%. By mid-2018, Instacart was available for use in 11 Canadian markets and was planning expansions for five more markets. Later in 2018, the company raised $200 million at a $4.2 billion valuation in a funding round led by Coatue Management, as well as Glade Brook Capital Partners and existing investors. In October 2018, Instacart raised another $600 million at a $7.6 billion valuation in a funding round led by hedge fund D1 Capital Partners. In the fall of 2018, Instacart announced national expansions with retailers, including Walmart Canada stores, Staples Canada, M&M Food Market, Kroger, Aldi, Sam's Club, Publix, and Costco. In November 2018, Instacart announced the national expansion of Instacart Pickup, a grocery click-and-collect service, whereby users pick up their pre-packaged orders at the grocery store. In November and December 2018, Instacart again changed its pay system for its personal shoppers; shoppers claimed this pay system resulted in substantially lower pay and boycotted. Instacart customers complained on social media that their orders were being delayed. At the end of the year, Instacart raised an additional $271 million from investors, including Andreessen Horowitz, Sequoia Capital, Kleiner Perkins, Comcast Ventures, Thrive Capital, Coatue Management, and Valiant Capital, bringing its latest round of fundraising to $871 million at a $7.87 billion valuation.

In February 2019, an online organizing campaign, including shoppers, provided examples of payments as low as $0.80 per delivery. The company announced that it would revise its pay system and give back pay to some workers. Under the revised pay system, tips were no longer factored into the minimum base wages, which were newly set at $7–$10 for a full-service shopping order (based on delivery market) and $5 for delivery only. In March 2019, Instacart expanded its same-day alcohol delivery service in the U.S. On April 11, 2019, the company expanded its services to offering an on-demand option for its workers, in order to allow workers to work more flexible schedules. Effective May 2019, Whole Foods Market ended its partnership with Instacart. By the end of December 2019, Instacart's alcohol delivery service included over 30 new partners in more than 20 states and Washington, D.C., such as Albertsons, Aldi, Sam's Club, BJ's Wholesale Club, Sprouts Farmers Market, The Fresh Market, and Total Wine & More.

2020s
In February 2020, Instacart employees in Skokie, Illinois voted to unionize. Instacart said it "will honor" the vote, pending certification of the results. In the lead-up to the election, high-level Instacart managers distributed anti-union literature at a Skokie grocery store where some of the unionizing workers pick up groceries for delivery. At the time, about 12,000 of Instacart's 142,000 workers were employees with the option of unionizing.

From mid-March to mid-April 2020, Instacart hired an additional 300,000 workers to meet the surge in demand for grocery deliveries during the COVID-19 pandemic. Data from Apptopia demonstrated a 218% increase in daily downloads as social distancing measures increased. Instacart also introduced new services in response to the pandemic, including a contactless delivery option, safety kits and guidelines for shoppers, and new sick leave policies and pay for those affected by COVID-19.

Instacart workers threatened to strike on March 27, 2020 due to a lack of COVID-19 safety measures. A group called the Gig Workers Collective called for a nationwide walk-out to be held on March 30. They had been asking Instacart to provide workers with hazard pay and protective gear, amongst other demands. In early April, Instacart began providing safety kits to workers, with complaints describing a complicated process to order and wait for the kits to arrive. In May, workers reported being denied sick leave despite quarantining under the advice of a doctor. Instacart required that workers either get a positive Covid-19 test or be under a mandatory quarantine by a public health agency or other government agency. By June, Instacart changed its sick leave rules in an agreement reached by it and D.C. Attorney General, Karl Racine. Under the agreement, Instacart would provide paid leave to workers who were clinically diagnosed with Covid-19 by a doctor or other medical profession along with those who had a household member contract Covid-19. The agreement also provided access for workers to telemedicine services.

In May 2020, Instacart began a partnership with Rite Aid, offering its service across 2,400 locations in 18 states. In August 2020, Instacart entered its first partnership with Walmart in the U.S. to offer same-day delivery services. The partnership is a pilot program beginning in Los Angeles, San Francisco, San Diego, and Tulsa. Additional partnerships in June included C&S Wholesale Grocers and Staples.

In October 2020, Instacart raised $200 million at a valuation of $17.7 billion in a financing round led by Valiant Capital and D1 Capital Partners.

On January 14, 2021, Instacart announced a vaccine support stipend to provide financial assistance to company shoppers who choose to get the COVID-19 vaccine.

On January 21, 2021, the company planned to lay off nearly 2,000 employees, including all of its employees who had voted to unionize. Instacart said that the layoffs were due to stores increasingly using Instacart to have consumers place orders, but have their own employees fulfill the order instead of Instacart's workforce, reducing reliance on Instacart's in-store shoppers.

As of its most recent funding round, in March 2021, Instacart raised $265 million at a valuation of $39 billion from existing venture capital investors including Andreessen Horowitz, Sequoia and D1 Capital Partners, as well as existing institutional investors like Fidelity and T. Rowe Price. In March 2022, Instacart slashed its valuation by almost 40% to $24 billion.

On July 8, 2021, Instacart announced that it had appointed Board Member Fidji Simo as CEO, while Apoorva Mehta transitioned to Executive Chairman of the Board.

On February 22, 2022, Instacart started to team up with Delta to give clients more ways to earn miles when they link their SkyMiles and Instacart accounts, with special earning bonuses for Instacart+ members.

On March 3, 2022, the platform celebrates women's history month by expanding advertising initiative with new $1 million to support Women-Owned Brands.

On March 16, 2022, in partnership with TikTok, Hearst Magazine and Tasty, Instacart launched Shoppable Recipes with new product integrations that allow food creators to make their recipes shoppable on Instacart.

On March 23, Instacart introduced the Instacart Platform, a program with services for retailers. The platform launched with features for advertising, home delivery, and inventory counting.

In May 2022, Instacart announced that it had confidentially submitted a draft registration statement on Form S-1 with the U.S. Securities and Exchange Commission, signaling its intent to go public. Instacart unveiled new partnerships with Canada's top 5 grocers: Metro, Giant Tiger, Galleria Supermarket and more, expanding same-day delivery countrywide.

In June 2022, Instacart+ (formerly Instacart Express) was introduced with new family shopping features, including sharing membership with another family member for free. The membership also allows for shopping-cart collaboration among family members.

In July 2022, Instacart appointed CEO Fidji Simo to succeed Apoorva Mehta as the Board Chair once the company completed its initial public offering. EBT SNAP is now accepted online via the Instacart Platform in 10 additional states- Colorado, Hawaii, Idaho, Louisiana, Montana, New Mexico, Oregon, Utah, Washington, and Wyoming - with launch partners Albertsons Companies and Sprouts Farmers Market.

In August 2022, Instacart added Carts to the app to allow users to buy items listed by celebrities, influencers, retailers, and other public figures.

In September 2022, Instacart announced it would be acquiring Eversight, an AI pricing platform for brands and retailers. Also in September, the company acquired Rosie, an e-commerce platform for local and independent retailers and wholesalers.

Service model
Orders are fulfilled and delivered by a personal shopper, who picks, packs, and delivers the order within the customer's designated time frame—within one hour or up to five days in advance. Customers pay with personal debit or credit cards, Google Pay, Apple Pay and EBT cards. The delivery fee is $3.99 for orders of $35 or more and $7.99 under that amount. Regardless of the cost of the order, there is a 5% service fee with a minimum of $2 owed. Instacart offers a membership service called Instacart+, formerly Instacart Express until June 2022, for a monthly fee of about $9.99 or an annual fee of $99. The membership service waives delivery fees on orders over $35, but customers must still pay the service fee for the shopper. Customers are also requested to leave a gratuity. Retailers participating in Instacart's partnership program set the price of individual items on the Instacart marketplace, which are mostly the same prices as in-store. In addition, customers can pick up their pre-made orders from the store through a separate service. For stores that do not participate in Instacart's partnership program, customers can be charged a markup of about 15%-40% per order with individual items ranging from a negative markup to over 50%.

Alcohol 
Instacart does alcohol delivery and pickup in 27 states plus Washington, D.C. and 2 provinces in Canada, including Alabama, Alberta, Arizona, California, Connecticut, Florida, Georgia, Hawaii, Idaho, Illinois, Iowa, Kentucky, Massachusetts, Michigan, Minnesota, Mississippi, Missouri, Nebraska, New Jersey, New York, North Carolina, Ohio, Ontario, Oregon, Texas, Tennessee, Virginia, Washington, and Wyoming. Instacart has alcohol delivery partnerships with more than 500 retail banners, including ALDI, Sam’s Club, BJs, Sprouts, The Fresh Market, 7-Eleven and Total Wine & More, among others, spanning more than 25,000 stores. Some areas of Nevada are allowing it as well.

References

2012 establishments in California
Multinational companies headquartered in the United States
Online grocers
American companies established in 2012
Retail companies established in 2012
Transport companies established in 2012
Internet properties established in 2012
Technology companies based in California
Y Combinator companies